Harley Bascom Ferguson (August 14, 1875 – August 29, 1968) was a United States Army officer in the late 19th and early 20th centuries. He served in several conflicts including the Spanish–American War and World War I, and he received the Distinguished Service Medal.

Biography
Ferguson was born on August 14, 1875, in Waynesville, North Carolina. He graduated from the United States Military Academy in 1897 and was commissioned into the United States Army Corps of Engineers.

After serving in Cuba during the Spanish–American War, Ferguson participated in the Philippine–American War starting in 1899. He served as Chief Engineer during the China Relief Expedition in 1900. Ferguson graduated from the Army Staff School in 1904. He served as the district engineer in Montgomery, Alabama from 1907 to 1909, and he served as the executive officer in charge of raising the USS Maine between 1910 and 1911. After returning to the U.S., Ferguson served as a district engineer in Milwaukee from 1913 to 1916.

During World War I in France, between September 12, 1917, and June 16, 1918, Ferguson commanded the 105th Engineers, and he served as the Second Corps Engineer from June 17, 1918, to October 3, 1918. He was promoted to the rank of brigadier general on August 8, 1918. Ferguson received the Distinguished Service Medal for his efforts in the war.

After the war's end, Ferguson reverted to his permanent rank. He served in several positions, including as a district engineer in Pittsburgh in 1920 and in Cincinnati from 1927 to 1929. Ferguson also worked in the Office of the Assistant Secretary of War between 1921 and 1926, and he also served in New Orleans, Vicksburg, Mississippi, and Norfolk, Virginia. By 1930, he also was a member of the Saint Lawrence Waterway Board and the River and Harbors Board, and in 1932 he became the president of the Mississippi River Commission, again as a brigadier general. Ferguson was promoted to major general on December 3, 1934, and he retired from the army in 1939, though he was recalled to active duty in 1942.

Ferguson lived in Vicksburg as a retiree, and he died in Lafayette, Louisiana, on August 29, 1968.

Personal life
Ferguson married Mary Virginia McCormack on January 3, 1907, and they had three children together.

References

Bibliography

1875 births
1968 deaths
People from Waynesville, North Carolina
People from Vicksburg, Mississippi
Military personnel from Florida
American military personnel of the Spanish–American War
United States Army generals of World War I
United States Army Corps of Engineers personnel
Recipients of the Distinguished Service Medal (US Army)
United States Military Academy alumni
American military personnel of the Boxer Rebellion
American military personnel of the Philippine–American War
United States Army generals